Céline Van Ouytsel (born 10 October 1996) is a Belgian model and beauty pageant titleholder who was crowned Miss Belgium 2020. She was chosen to represent Belgium at Miss World 2021.

Early life
Van Ouytsel was born in Herentals, Antwerp, located in the Dutch-speaking region of Flanders in Belgium. Van Ouytsel attended the University of Antwerp, where she received a Master of Laws degree.

Pageantry
Van Ouytsel began her pageantry career in 2015, placing as the second runner-up at Miss Antwerp 2016, behind eventual Miss Belgium 2016 winner Lenty Frans. She returned to pageantry four years later, when she competed in and won Miss Antwerp 2020.

After winning Miss Antwerp, Van Ouytsel was given the opportunity to compete at Miss Belgium 2020, representing Antwerp. At Miss Belgium, Van Ouytsel introduced herself as "Miss Legally Blonde", because she has a law degree, is blonde, and loves the color pink, much like the film's protagonist Elle Woods – Van Ouytsel even drives a pink 4×4. Due to her strong online presence, Van Ouytsel was also awarded the special title Miss Social Networks at Miss Belgium. While competing in the evening gown portion of Miss Belgium, Van Ouytsel fell on stage, which resulted in a bra that had been stuck to her gown falling off and being left behind on stage; this received widespread attention throughout the Belgian media.

Despite her fall, Van Ouytsel went on to be crowned Miss Belgium 2020. This made her the seventh consecutive Flemish woman to win, and the fifth to come from Antwerp Province in a span of six years. As Miss Belgium, Van Ouytsel competed in Miss World 2021.

References

External links

1997 births
Belgian beauty pageant winners
Belgian female models
Living people
Miss Belgium winners
Miss World 2021 delegates
People from Herentals
University of Antwerp alumni